Steven de Sousa Vitória (born 11 January 1987) is a Canadian professional soccer player who plays as a centre-back for Primeira Liga club Chaves and the Canada national team.

Having started out at Porto, he went on to play for several clubs in Portugal in both the Primeira Liga and the Segunda Liga, this including a one-year spell at Benfica. He also competed professionally in the United States and Poland.

Vitória is a Canadian international, making his debut in 2016 at the age of 29, after previously representing Portugal at youth international level. He was part of the squads at the CONCACAF Gold Cup in 2017 and 2021, reaching the semi-finals of the latter, and at the 2022 World Cup.

Early life
Born in Toronto, Ontario, Canada, to Portuguese immigrants from the Azores, Vitória played youth soccer with the Sudbury Lions, CS Azzurri, Mississauga Falcons, Dixie SC, Kleinburg-Nobleton SC, and Glen Shields SC. He joined the Woodbridge Strikers at the age of 17, being deployed mainly as a striker. He was approached to appear for Canada's youth national teams on multiple occasions after leaving the country, but declined each time.

Club career

Porto
Vitória was signed by FC Porto at the age of 18, already reconverted as a central defender. In the following years he began a series of loans, starting out at G.D. Tourizense in the third division then joining S.C. Olhanense for two years, and helping the Algarve side promote to the Primeira Liga in his second season by appearing in 18 games, 15 as a starter.

In the 2009–10 campaign, Vitória continued on loan, this time with S.C. Covilhã in the Segunda Liga. He played his first official match for his new club on 2 August 2009, in a 1–0 away win against A.D. Carregado in the Taça da Liga.

Estoril
Vitória cut all ties with Porto in July 2010, signing with G.D. Estoril Praia in the second division. In his debut season in the top flight, 2012–13, he played 27 games and scored 11 goals to finish ninth in the top scorers' chart– eight of them from penalties – to help his team finish fifth and qualify for the UEFA Europa League.

Benfica
Free agent Vitória joined S.L. Benfica on 16 June 2013, signing a four-year contract; he called the day of his signing "the most important and happiest day of my life". His only league appearance took place in the last day of the season as the club had already been crowned champions, and he played the full 90 minutes in a 2–1 loss at former side Porto.

Vitória was an unused substitute in Benfica's loss in the Europa League final to Sevilla FC on penalties. After becoming unsatisfied with his status, he was targeted by Real Betis and C.S. Marítimo.

On 9 February 2015, Vitória was loaned to Major League Soccer side Philadelphia Union for one season. He scored his first goal for the team in his hometown, in a 3–1 away defeat to Toronto FC, being released in December after the club declined against exercising its contract option on the player.

Lechia Gdańsk
Vitória joined Lechia Gdańsk on 17 August 2016, signing a three-year contract. He made his debut on 21 September, playing the entire round-of-16 penalty shootout loss to Puszcza Niepołomice in the Polish Cup (1–1 after 120 minutes).

Moreirense
Vitória returned to Portugal to sign with Moreirense F.C. on 4 July 2019, agreeing to a three-year deal. He made his debut on 11 August, playing the entire 3–1 defeat at S.C. Braga. He scored his first goal on 2 November, in a 1–1 home draw against Vitória de Guimarães.

Chaves
On 4 July 2022, after being relegated, the 35-year-old Vitória joined newly promoted G.D. Chaves for an undisclosed fee. He scored his first goal on 27 August, a powerful long-range header to open the 2–0 victory at Sporting CP.

International career

Portugal
Vitória represented Portugal at the 2006 Lusophony Games in Macau, the 2006 UEFA European Under-19 Championship in Poland and the 2007 FIFA U-20 World Cup in his birth nation. In the latter tournament, he featured in the 2–1 group stage loss to Gambia.

Canada
In September 2012, without having been capped at senior level, 25-year-old Vitória considered switching allegiance to Canada. In January 2016, he accepted a call-up by the country for a friendly against the United States on 5 February, and played the full 90 minutes in the 1–0 defeat at the Home Depot Center. He scored his first goal on 6 October, helping to a 4–0 friendly win over Mauritania.

Vitória was named to the Canadian squads for the CONCACAF Gold Cup in 2017 and 2021. In the latter tournament, he captained the side to the semi-final, where he was suspended for the 2–1 defeat to Mexico in Houston.

In November 2022, Vitória was included in the squad for the 2022 FIFA World Cup. He made his debut in the competition on the 23rd at the age of 35, in a 1–0 loss against Belgium.

Style of play
Vitória is known for his heading, marking and scoring abilities, especially on penalty kicks and free kicks.

Career statistics

Club

International

Scores and results list Canada's goal tally first, score column indicates score after each Vitória goal.

Honours
Olhanense
Segunda Liga: 2008–09

Estoril
Segunda Liga: 2011–12

Benfica
Primeira Liga: 2013–14
Taça de Portugal: 2013–14
Taça da Liga: 2013–14
UEFA Europa League runner-up: 2013–14

Lechia Gdańsk
Polish Cup: 2018–19

References

External links

1987 births
Living people
Canadian people of Portuguese descent
Canadian people of Azorean descent
Canadian soccer players
Portuguese footballers
Soccer players from Toronto
Association football defenders
Primeira Liga players
Liga Portugal 2 players
Segunda Divisão players
FC Porto players
G.D. Tourizense players
S.C. Olhanense players
S.C. Covilhã players
G.D. Estoril Praia players
S.L. Benfica B players
S.L. Benfica footballers
Moreirense F.C. players
G.D. Chaves players
Major League Soccer players
Philadelphia Union players
Ekstraklasa players
Lechia Gdańsk players
Portugal youth international footballers
Canada men's international soccer players
2017 CONCACAF Gold Cup players
2021 CONCACAF Gold Cup players
2022 FIFA World Cup players
Canadian expatriate soccer players
Portuguese expatriate footballers
Expatriate footballers in Poland
Canadian expatriate sportspeople in the United States
Portuguese expatriate sportspeople in the United States
Canadian expatriate sportspeople in Poland
Portuguese expatriate sportspeople in Poland